Banjole is a village in the municipality of Medulin, in southern Istria in Croatia. In 2011 it had a population of 983.

See also
 Barbariga, Croatia

References

Populated places in Istria County